The 1961 MLB Expansion Draft was held by Major League Baseball on October 10, 1961, to fill the rosters of the New York Mets and the Houston Colt .45s, the new franchises which would enter the league in the 1962 season. The pool of players out of which they could select was limited to the existing National League ballclubs.

Due to the poor performance of the Mets and Colt .45s after two seasons, another draft was held for the teams. The other existing National League clubs made four players from their 40-man roster available at $30,000 apiece. Only eight players could be selected between the two clubs.

1961 Draft

* All-Star only before 1961 Expansion Draft

1963 Draft

References

External links
 Major League Baseball Historical Expansion Drafts
 Houston Colt .45s 1961 Expansion Draft
 baseball-reference.com
 Starting Fresh – The Expansion of 1962

Major League Baseball Expansion Draft, 1961
Major League Baseball expansion drafts
Expansion draft
New York Mets
Houston Astros
Continental League
Major League Baseball expansion draft